Hearsay - All Mixed Up (also known as All Mixed Up') is a remix album consisting of songs performed by American recording artist Alexander O'Neal. It was originally released in 1988, by Tabu and Epic.  It collects together single remixes of tracks taken from O'Neal's critically and commercially successful 1987 album Hearsay.  CD and cassette releases contain bonus tracks featuring contemporary remixes of songs from the earlier Alexander O'Neal album.

Track listing
"Fake 88 (House Mix)"
"(What Can I Say) To Make You Love Me (Hateful Club Mix)"
"Never Knew Love Like This (Extended Version)" – (featuring Cherrelle)
"Criticize (Ben Liebrand Remix)"
"The Lovers (Extended Version)"
"Criticize (Remix)"
"(What Can I Say) To Make You Love Me (Ben Liebrand Remix)"
"Fake (Extended Version)"
"You Were Meant to Be My Lady (88 Keith Cohen Extended Remix)"
"Innocent (88 Keith Cohen House Mix)"
LP contains tracks 1-8 only.
On the USA version the track one title is "Fake 89 (House Mix)" due to the album being released in 1989.
The 1990 Japan release contains an extra track called "Hitmix (The Official Bootleg Mega Mix - 7 Inch Version)".

Charts

Release history

References

External links
 All Mixed Up at Discogs

Alexander O'Neal albums
1987 albums
Albums produced by Jimmy Jam and Terry Lewis
Tabu Records albums